In warfare, high-explosive incendiary (HEI) is a type of ammunition specially designed to impart energy and therefore damage to its target in one or both of two ways:  via a high-explosive charge and/or via its incendiary (fire-causing) effects.  Each round has both capabilities.

HEI ammunition is fused either mechanically or chemically. The armor-piercing ability can vary widely, allowing for more focused fragmentation or larger scatter.

History 

HEI ammunition was originally developed for use in large-caliber cannon, howitzer and naval artillery. Currently, HEI rounds are most commonly made in medium-caliber sizes of 20, 25, and 30 mm. They are fired from various platforms, including aircraft, anti-aircraft cannons, and anti-missile systems, as well as common battlefield howitzers, though the latter has gone through a recent decline in use.

HEI ammunition has also been used on the battlefield against tanks and other armoured vehicles, but this has become impractical due to the invention of modern armour systems such as Chobham and reactive armour, which can absorb most high-explosive rounds currently used. 

Recently, API (armour-piercing incendiary) shells have been used; these penetrate targets using the kinetic properties of the round before the incendiary round goes off, smothering the crew in flames, cooking off ammunition and igniting combustible materials, generally destroying the target.

Uses 

The shells were first employed in naval batteries, but soon found their way to land-based howitzers as well. They caused fires, which on ships can be difficult to extinguish in the tight spaces. Also, fired at tanks and soft targets, they can cause fires that completely engulf the vehicle, killing anyone inside.

Occasionally, HEIs were used against tanks (heavily armoured) and also lightly armoured vehicles, but, since the invention of modern battle armour, such as Chobham and reactive armour, these shells have become less and less practical for anti-tank work and more useful for destroying "soft" targets such as air bases, trenches, or bunkers, in which they can create fires of over 1000 degrees Celsius. Incendiary shells are no longer in use by many countries due to bans on the use of phosphorus weapons.

Armour-piercing shot and shell penetrate the target using kinetic energy before the incendiary charge ignites, smothering the crew in flames, detonating ammunition, and destroying the target.

See also
 High explosive incendiary/armor piercing ammunition (HEIAP)

References

External links

Live fire experiment of mechanically fuzed HEI rounds
Example of US military 30 mm HEI round
Example of NATO 35×228mm HEI round from Nammo
Fragmentation pattern of a German Round

Artillery ammunition
Anti-tank rounds
Explosive_weapons
Incendiary weapons